Lamyaa Badawi (born 1 April 1988) is an Egyptian synchronized swimmer. She competed in the women's team event at the 2008 Olympic Games.

References 

1993 births
Living people
Egyptian synchronized swimmers
Olympic synchronized swimmers of Egypt
Synchronized swimmers at the 2008 Summer Olympics